KCDY (104.1 FM) is a radio station  broadcasting an adult contemporary format, licensed to Carlsbad, New Mexico, United States. The station is currently owned by KAMQ, Inc.

On November 19, 2021, a single-engine aircraft crashed into the tower, resulting in the collapse of most of the tower structure; the pilot was killed in the ensuing crash.

References

External links
KCDY Mix 104 Facebook

CDY
Mainstream adult contemporary radio stations in the United States
1989 establishments in New Mexico
Radio stations established in 1989